Cupriavidus is a genus of bacteria that includes the former genus Wautersia. They are characterized as Gram-negative, motile, rod-shaped organisms with oxidative metabolism. They possess peritrichous flagella, are obligate aerobic organisms, and are chemoorganotrophic or chemolithotrophic. Resistance to metals (including copper) has been described. These organisms have been found in both soil and in clinical isolates.

References

External links
J.P. Euzéby: List of Prokaryotic names with Standing in Nomenclature

Burkholderiaceae
Bacteria genera